Civitella d'Agliano is a  (municipality) in the Province of Viterbo in the Italian region of Latium, located about  northwest of Rome and about  northeast of Viterbo.

Civitella d'Agliano borders the following municipalities: Alviano, Bagnoregio, Castiglione in Teverina, Graffignano, Guardea, Montecchio, Orvieto, Viterbo.

References

Cities and towns in Lazio